The 2003 Derby City Council election took place on 1 May 2003 to elect members of Derby City Council in England. One third of the council was up for election and the Labour Party lost overall control of the council to no overall control.

After the election, the composition of the council was:
Labour 25
Liberal Democrat 13
Conservative 12
Independent 1

Election result

Ward results

Abbey

Allestree

Alvaston

Arboretum

Blagreaves

Boulton

Chaddesden

Chellaston (2 seats)

Darley

Derwent

Littleover

Mackworth

Mickleover

Normanton

Oakwood

Sinfin

Spondon

References

2003 English local elections
2003
2000s in Derby